Binao (also known as Bianu) is a village in southern Ivory Coast. It is in the sub-prefecture of Gbolouville, Tiassalé Department, Agnéby-Tiassa Region, Lagunes District.

Until 2012, Binao was in the commune of Binao-Boussoué. In March 2012, Binao-Boussoué became one of 1126 communes nationwide that were abolished.

Notes

Populated places in Lagunes District
Populated places in Agnéby-Tiassa